1 Regiment Army Air Corps is a regiment of the Army Air Corps (AAC).

History

 Detmold | 9, 17 & 26 Flights | 1964-1969
 Detmold | 651, 657 & 658 Squadrons | 1969-1971
 HQ at Detmold | 651 at Verden, 657 at Soltau & 658 Squadron at Minden  | 1971-1976
 Hildesheim | 651 & 661 | 1977-1980
 Hildesheim | 651 & 661 | 1981-1983
 Hildesheim | 651, 652 & 661 | 1983-1990
 Hildesheim | 651, 652 & 661 | 1990-1994
 Gutersloh | 1994-2015
 RNAS Yeovilton | 2015-present

Until 1993 the regiment was based at Tofrek Barracks with 651 & 652 Squadrons using a mix of Westland Lynxs and Westland Gazelles. Previously, RHQ was located at Verden along with 651 Sqn AAC whilst 658 Sqn AAC was located at St Georges Barracks in Minden.

Structure

The regiment consists of:
 No. 651 Squadron AAC
 No. 652 (Wildcat Fielding) Squadron AAC - Wildcat.
 No. 659 Squadron AAC. Previously part of 9 Regiment AAC.
 No. 661 Squadron AAC - Wildcat.

See also
 List of Army Air Corps aircraft units

Notes

References 

Army Air Corps regiments
Military units and formations established in 1964
Helicopter units and formations